The Battle of Maeso was a battle between Silla and Tang forces in the Korean peninsula.
On September 29, 675, a confrontation occurred between a Silla forces under the command of Kim Wonsul and a Tang forces under Li Jinxing.

South Korean history books claim killed 6,047 cavalry of Tang and captures 30,380 horses and weapons of about 30,000.

Notes

Wars involving Silla
Battles involving the Tang dynasty
History of Gyeonggi Province